HD 73390, also called e1 Carinae, is a binary star system in the constellation Carina.  It is approximately 870 light years from Earth. The primary is a blue-white B-type main sequence dwarf with an apparent magnitude of +5.27. It displays an infrared excess and is a candidate host of an orbiting debris disk.  The secondary is a magnitude 8.9 star which has a mass and temperature similar to the Sun.

References

B-type main-sequence stars
Carina (constellation)
Carinae, e1
Durchmusterung objects
073390
042129
3415